List of the National Register of Historic Places listings in Washington County, New York

This is intended to be a complete list of properties and districts listed on the National Register of Historic Places in Washington County, New York.  The locations of National Register properties and districts (at least for all showing latitude and longitude coordinates below) may be seen in a map by clicking on "Map of all coordinates". One property, the Lemuel Haynes House, is further designated a U.S. National Historic Landmark.



County-wide listings

|}

See also

National Register of Historic Places listings in New York

References

Washington County
Buildings and structures in Washington County, New York